Ryan Williams (born 22 June 1994), known as R-Willy, is an Australian freestyle scooter and BMX rider. He performs with the Nitro Circus, and has a large online following on YouTube and Instagram.

Early life
Ryan Williams grew up on the Sunshine Coast, Queensland, Australia, the son of a former top-rated female BMX racer. At the age of 7, he saw the 2001 X Games documentary Ultimate X, after which he began rollerblading, and then picked up scootering in 2006 at age 12 at his local skatepark in Caloundra, followed by BMX at age 15.

Career

In 2012, after a video of his scooter tricks went viral, Williams joined the Nitro Circus team, aged 17 and in his final year of secondary school. He continues to perform with the Nitro Circus, signing a one million dollar three-year contract in 2016.

Prolific in social media and known as a YouTuber, Williams had 356,000 Instagram followers and 757,000 YouTube subscribers by 2017; the latter number had grown to 1.85 million by 2023. Between June 2008 and October 2022, his YouTube channel published 563 videos for a rate of a video every 11 days on average.

In his career, he has achieved a total of 9 gold medals in scooter and BMX events at the Nitro World Games and the X Games and a silver medal in each.

Like most extreme sports athletes, Williams has suffered serious injuries, though perhaps not as severe as many of his peers given the risk involved in the tricks he attempts. He has dislocated both shoulders, broken an ankle and an arm, knocked out teeth, and suffered several skull fractures.

World's First Tricks
Williams is notable for innovative and daring new developments on both BMX and scooter, achieving more than a dozen "world's first" tricks.

R-Willy Land
In 2019, Williams purchased 40-acres of land in Eudlo near the Sunshine Coast to build a large action sports facility, which he named "R-Willy Land". This facility, the first of its kind in Australia, features a 13-foot mega ramp used by athletes to train for the Nitro Circus tour and other events, having been the host of scooter rider qualifications for the Nitro World Games 2022. 
Future plans for the property include action sports camps and clinics run as "a mixture of Woodward and Pastranaland." Williams' father lives on and maintains the property, having earned the nickname of "Groundskeeper Willy," and shaped the majority of the run-in to the megaramp as well as caring for the mango orchard that was on-site when the property was purchased.

References

Living people
1993 births
BMX riders
Australian YouTubers